Evangelista Santos ( born December 12, 1977) is a Brazilian retired mixed martial artist. A professional from 1997 until 2016, Santos competed for Strikeforce, Bellator MMA, the PRIDE Fighting Championships, Cage Rage, International Vale Tudo Championships, Pancrase, Jungle Fight, Legacy FC, and World Victory Road. Known for his exciting fighting style, 14 of his 21 wins ended via knockout.

Background
Born and raised in the city of Rondonopolis, Santos did not have a particularly safe upbringing; at the age of 12, he was introduced to cockfighting, which was popular and not yet illegal in Brazil. After training and taking care of fighting roosters for five more years, he began training in kickboxing which eventually led him to vale tudo at the age of 18. Santos was also a four-time Brazilian national champion in Muay Thai.

Mixed martial arts career

Early career
Santos turned professional when he was 20 years old and began his career 2-0 before facing legendary Brazilian fighter Jose "Pele" Landi-Jons, losing by TKO. Santos won his first two fights with the British Cage Rage organization before returning to Brazil's Jungle Fight, winning over future KSW Middleweight Champion Michal Materla by knockout, which is Materla's only knockout loss of his career to date. Santos then fought against Dutch kickboxer Melvin "No Mercy" Manhoef for the Cage Rage World Light Heavyweight Championship. The two fought a highly-entertaining bout, trading punches but Santos ultimately lost after being knocked out. Santos won his next two fights, including a majority decision over future UFC veteran Francis Carmont before making his debut in PRIDE FC.

PRIDE Fighting Championships
Santos made his debut in Japan's PRIDE FC against submission specialist Kazuhiro Nakamura, losing by a keylock submission. His next fight with the Japanese organization was against Japanese professional boxer Yosuke Nishijima, which Santos won by a rear-naked choke submission.

World Victory Road
Santos fought again for the Cage Rage World Light Heavyweight Championship against James Zikic but lost by unanimous decision. Santos also lost his next fight against Armenian superstar Gegard Mousasi by TKO before making his debut in World Victory Road Presents: Sengoku Raiden Championships against Makoto Takimoto, winning by an achilles lock. Santos fought once more for the Japanese organization against future UFC veteran Siyar Bahadurzada, losing by TKO after receiving an arm injury.

Strikeforce
Santos made his Strikeforce debut June 19, 2009 and headlined the Strikeforce Challengers: Villasenor vs. Cyborg event, but came up short against former King of the Cage Middleweight Champion Joey Villasenor losing by a split decision. In his next fight, he went on to face and defeat Marius Zaromskis, who battled Nick Diaz for the vacant Strikeforce Welterweight Title.

Santos challenged Strikeforce Welterweight Champion Nick Diaz for the title on January 29, 2011 at the HP Pavilion in San Jose, California. He lost the fight via armbar submission in the second round.

Santos was due to fight Paul Daley at Strikeforce: Fedor vs. Henderson but was forced to withdraw due to a shoulder injury.
Santos fought Strikeforce newcomer Jordan Mein on September 10, 2011 at Strikeforce World Grand Prix: Barnett vs. Kharitonov. After a grueling back and forth fight "Cyborg" was defeated by Mein via TKO due to Elbows in the third round handing "Cyborg" back to back defeats, Santos has now suffered his fourth loss in his last six fights.

After a long period of inactivity, Santos requested his release from Strikeforce to fight more consistently. His request was granted.

Legacy Fighting Championship
Santos was expected to face Pete Spratt at Legacy Fighting Championship 17 on February 1, 2013. However, Santos was forced to pull out of the bout due to injury and was replaced by Dan Hornbuckle.

After nearly two years away from the sport, Santos returned to face Artenas Young in the main event during Legacy Fighting Championship 50 on January 22, 2016. He won the fight by unanimous decision.

Gringo Super Fight
Santos made his GSF debut on April 28, 2014, against Melvin Manhoef in a rematch from 2006. Santos, who was knocked out by Manhoef in their first outing, lost to Manhoef again via first-round knockout. Santos then announced his retirement shortly after the fight.

Bellator MMA
On March 1, 2016, it was announced that Santos signed a multi-fight contract with Bellator MMA.

Santos made his  organizational debut April 22 on the main card of Bellator 153 in a welterweight matchup beating Brennan Ward via first round submission.

Making a quick turnaround, Santos agreed to fight Saad Awad at Bellator 154 on May 14, 2016 but lost.

On July 16, 2016, Santos faced Michael "Venom" Page and was defeated via KO by a flying knee, resulting in a frontal sinus fracture.

Santos retired in January 2017. He spent a year coaching in Curitiba, Brazil. In early 2018 he returned to the USA and is coaching in his own gym in Texas. In August 2018 Santos confirmed he had no plans to return to competition.

Personal life
Santos was married to women's MMA fighter Cristiane Justino from 2005 to December 2011. It was during this time she adopted his nickname for herself.

Mixed martial arts record 

|-
|Loss
|align=center|21–18
|Michael Page
|KO (flying knee) 
|Bellator 158
|
|align=center|2
|align=center|4:31
|London, United Kingdom
|
|-
|Loss
|align=center|21–17
|Saad Awad
|TKO (punches)
|Bellator 154	 
|	 
|align=center|1
|align=center|4:31
|San Jose, California, United States
|
|-
|Win
|align=center|21–16
|Brennan Ward
|Submission (heel hook)
|Bellator 153	 
|	 
|align=center|1
|align=center|0:30
|Uncasville, Connecticut, United States
|
|-
| Win
| align=center| 20–16
| Artenas Young
| Decision (unanimous)
| Legacy FC 50
| 
| align=center| 3
| align=center| 5:00
| Houston, Texas, United States
| 
|-
| Loss
| align=center| 19–16
| Melvin Manhoef
| TKO (punches)
| Gringo Super Fight 10
| 
| align=center| 1
| align=center| 0:46
| Rio de Janeiro, Brazil
| 
|-
| Win
| align=center| 19–15
| Elton Rodrigues
| TKO (punches)
| Warriors of God
| 
| align=center| 1
| align=center| 1:37
| Uberlandia, Minas Gerais, Brazil
| 
|-
| Loss
| align=center| 18–15
| Jordan Mein
| TKO (elbows)
| Strikeforce: Barnett vs. Kharitonov
| 
| align=center| 3
| align=center| 3:18
| Cincinnati, Ohio, United States
| 
|-
| Loss
| align=center| 18–14
| Nick Diaz
| Submission (armbar)
| Strikeforce: Diaz vs. Cyborg
| 
| align=center| 2
| align=center| 4:50
| San Jose, California, United States
| |

|-
| Win
| align=center| 18–13
| Marius Žaromskis
| TKO (punches)
| Strikeforce: Los Angeles
| 
| align=center| 1
| align=center| 2:38
| Los Angeles, California, United States
| 
|-
| Win
| align=center| 17–13
| Daniel Zarate
| TKO (head kick and punches)
| Samurai Fight Combat 2
| 
| align=center| 1
| align=center| 1:41
| Curitiba, Brazil
|Welterweight debut.
|-
| Loss
| align=center| 16–13
| Joey Villasenor
| Decision (split)
| Strikeforce Challengers: Villasenor vs. Cyborg
| 
| align=center| 3
| align=center| 5:00
| Kent, Washington, United States
| 
|-
| Loss
| align=center| 16–12
| Siyar Bahadurzada
| TKO (arm injury)
| World Victory Road Presents: Sengoku 5
| 
| align=center| 1
| align=center| 0:35
| Tokyo, Japan
| 
|-
| Win
| align=center| 16–11
| Makoto Takimoto
| Submission (achilles lock)
| World Victory Road Presents: Sengoku First Battle
| 
| align=center| 1
| align=center| 4:51
| Tokyo, Japan
| 
|-
| Loss
| align=center| 15–11
| Gegard Mousasi
| TKO (punches)
| HCF: Destiny
| 
| align=center| 1
| align=center| 3:42
| Calgary, Canada
| Middleweight debut.
|-
| Loss
| align=center| 15–10
| James Zikic
| Decision (unanimous)
| Cage Rage 21
| 
| align=center| 5
| align=center| 5:00
| London, United Kingdom
| For the Cage Rage World Light Heavyweight Championship.
|-
| Win
| align=center| 15–9
| Yosuke Nishijima
| Submission (rear-naked choke)
| PRIDE FC: Final Conflict Absolute
| 
| align=center| 1
| align=center| 3:24
| Saitama, Japan
| 
|-
| Loss
| align=center| 14–9
| Kazuhiro Nakamura
| Submission (americana)
| PRIDE FC: Critical Countdown Absolute
| 
| align=center| 1
| align=center| 4:49
| Saitama, Japan
| 
|-
| Win
| align=center| 14–8
| Francis Carmont
| Decision (majority)
| WFC: Europe vs Brazil
| 
| align=center| 3
| align=center| 5:00
| Koper, Slovenia
| 
|-
| Win
| align=center| 13–8
| Roberto Godoi
| Decision (unanimous)
| Show Fight 4
| 
| align=center| 3
| align=center| 5:00
| São Paulo, Brazil
| 
|-
| Loss
| align=center| 12–8
| Melvin Manhoef
| KO (punches)
| Cage Rage 15
| 
| align=center| 2
| align=center| 3:51
| London, United Kingdom
| For the Cage Rage World Light Heavyweight Championship.
|-
| Win
| align=center| 12–7
| Michal Materla
| KO (punches)
| Jungle Fight 5
| 
| align=center| 2
| align=center| 2:03
| Manaus, Brazil
| 
|-
| Win
| align=center| 11–7
| Darren Little
| TKO (corner stoppage)
| Cage Rage 13
| 
| align=center| 1
| align=center| 0:55
| London, United Kingdom
| 
|-
| Win
| align=center| 10–7
| Kassim Annan
| TKO (submission to soccer kicks)
| Meca World Vale Tudo 12
| 
| align=center| 1
| align=center| 3:43
| Rio de Janeiro, Brazil
| 
|-
| Win
| align=center| 9–7
| Mark Epstein
| TKO (punches)
| Cage Rage 11
| 
| align=center| 1
| align=center| 2:16
| London, United Kingdom
| 
|-
| Loss
| align=center| 8–7
| Antony Rea
| TKO (punches)
| Cage Rage 10
| 
| align=center| 2
| align=center| 1:55
| London, United Kingdom
| 
|-
| Loss
| align=center| 8–6
| Yuki Kondo
| Decision (unanimous)
| Pancrase: Brave 10
| 
| align=center| 3
| align=center| 5:00
| Tokyo, Japan
| 
|-
| Loss
| align=center| 8–5
| Claudio Godoi
| TKO (punches)
| Conquista Fight 1
| 
| align=center| 3
| align=center| 2:23
| Bahia, Brazil
| 
|-
| Win
| align=center| 8–4
| Lucas Lopes
| TKO (punches and leg kick)
| Jungle Fight 1
| 
| align=center| 2
| align=center| 4:08
| Manaus, Brazil
| 
|-
| Loss
| align=center| 7–4
| Maurício Rua
| TKO (punches)
| Meca World Vale Tudo 9
| 
| align=center| 1
| align=center| 8:12
| Rio de Janeiro, Brazil
| 
|-
| Win
| align=center| 7–3
| Gabriel Santos
| KO (knee)
| K-NOCK
| 
| align=center| 1
| align=center| 1:01
| Rio de Janeiro, Brazil
| 
|-
| Win
| align=center| 6–3
| Osami Shibuya
| KO (punch)
| Pancrase: Hybrid 5
| 
| align=center| 1
| align=center| 1:20
| Yokohama, Japan
| 
|-
| Win
| align=center| 5–3
| Silvio de Souza
| KO (punch)
| Meca World Vale Tudo 7
| 
| align=center| 1
| align=center| 0:10
| Curitiba, Brazil
| 
|-
| Loss
| align=center| 4–3
| Angelo Araujo
| TKO (punches)
| IVC 14: USA vs Brazil
| 
| align=center| 1
| align=center| 8:46
| Caracas, Venezuela
| 
|-
| Win
| align=center| 4–2
| Jefferson Silva
| KO (punch)
| IVC 14: USA vs Brazil
| 
| align=center| 1
| align=center| 2:28
| Caracas, Venezuela
| 
|-
| Win
| align=center| 3–2
| Aaron Sullivan
| TKO (punches)
| IVC 14: USA vs Brazil
| 
| align=center| 1
| align=center| 0:13
| Caracas, Venezuela
| 
|-
| Loss
| align=center| 2–2
| Jorge Magalhaes
| Decision (unanimous)
| Heroes 2
| 
| align=center| 1
| align=center| 12:00
| Rio de Janeiro, Brazil
| 
|-
| Loss
| align=center| 2–1
| Jose Landi-Jons
| TKO (punches)
| BVF 8: Campeonato Brasileiro de Vale Tudo 2
| 
| align=center| 1
| align=center| 8:18
| Brazil
| 
|-
| Win
| align=center| 2–0
| Adriano Verdelli
| TKO (submission to punches)
| BVF 8: Campeonato Brasileiro de Vale Tudo 2
| 
| align=center| 1
| align=center| 1:56
| Brazil
| 
|-
| Win
| align=center| 1–0
| Roberto Pereira
| Submission (rear-naked choke)
| BVF 8: Campeonato Brasileiro de Vale Tudo 2
| 
| align=center| 1
| align=center| 2:37
| Brazil
|

See also
 List of Bellator MMA alumni
 List of Strikeforce alumni

References

External links 
 Official Page On Cris Cyborg's Website
 
 Official Website (Under Development)
 Strikeforce Fighter Profile

1977 births
Living people
People from Rondonópolis
Brazilian male mixed martial artists
Welterweight mixed martial artists
Middleweight mixed martial artists
Light heavyweight mixed martial artists
Mixed martial artists utilizing Brazilian jiu-jitsu
Mixed martial artists utilizing Muay Thai
Brazilian Muay Thai practitioners
Brazilian practitioners of Brazilian jiu-jitsu
People awarded a black belt in Brazilian jiu-jitsu
Sportspeople from Mato Grosso